The Church of Our Saviour is an historic Carpenter Gothic style Episcopal Church located on Eastport Street between Main and Fulton streets in Iuka, Mississippi Designed by architect James B. Cook, it was built in 1873. Its board and batten siding, steep roofs and lancet windows are typical of Carpenter Gothic churches. In order to prevent its removal, local citizens bought it from the Episcopal Diocese of Mississippi in 1985.

It was placed on the National Register of Historic Places in 1991 and was restored in 1992. It is a venue for weddings and other events.

References

Churches on the National Register of Historic Places in Mississippi
Carpenter Gothic church buildings in Mississippi
Episcopal church buildings in Mississippi
Historic districts on the National Register of Historic Places in Mississippi
National Register of Historic Places in Tishomingo County, Mississippi
Iuka, Mississippi